Kevin Andrews may refer to:
 Kevin Andrews (politician) (born 1955), Australian politician
 Kevin Andrews (writer) (1924–1989), American writer and archaeologist